The 2001–02 Alabama Crimson Tide men's basketball team (variously "Alabama", "UA", "Bama" or "The Tide") represented the University of Alabama in the 2001–02 college basketball season. The head coach was Mark Gottfried, who was in his forth season at Alabama. The team played its home games at Coleman Coliseum in Tuscaloosa, Alabama and was a member of the Southeastern Conference. This was the 90th season of basketball in the school's history. The Crimson Tide finished the season 27–8, 12–4 in SEC play, they lost in the championship game of the 2002 SEC men's basketball tournament after winning the regular season championship for the first time since 1986-87. They were invited to the NCAA tournament but, lost in the second round.

Roster

Schedule and results

|-
!colspan=12 style=|Exhibition

|-
!colspan=12 style=|Non-conference regular season

|-
!colspan=12 style=|SEC regular season

|-
!colspan=12 style=| SEC tournament

|-
!colspan=12 style="background:#990000; color:#FFFFFF;"|  NCAA tournament

See also
2002 NCAA Division I men's basketball tournament
2001–02 NCAA Division I men's basketball season
2001–02 NCAA Division I men's basketball rankings

References

Alabama
Alabama Crimson Tide men's basketball seasons
2001 in sports in Alabama
Alabama Crimson Tide
Alabama